The Mogaveera, or Mogavira is a subcaste of the Koli caste living in the Karnataka state of India. They were employed as soldiers in coastal Karnataka.

History 
Mogaveera is a fishermen community, traditionally they were also occupied in professions such as Boatmen, Porters and Palanquin bearers, they are also believed to be warriors of an ancient kingdom after the demolition of which began to live on river belts and coastal belts and pursue their traditional occupation of fishing.

Mogaveera people form a community who dominate fishing and marine activities in and around Mangalore. The Mogaveeras who have taken up fishing as their profession are called Marakalas. Some have also found occupation as peasants and artisans.

Community organisations 
A community organisation called Dakshina Kannada Mogaveera Mahajana Sabha (DKMMS) was established in 1923 with 146 gram sabha. There were other such associations previously, including one in Bombay that was founded in 1902; others included those at Mangalore, Barkur and Udupi, some of which merged. The various groups became distinguishable by the different languages.

The Mogaveera Bank was established in 1946 in a suburban district of Bombay. It is one of the leading co-operative banks operating in Mumbai, having branches in Borivali and other areas. It is managed by people belonging to Mogaveera community.

Classification 
The Mogaveera Kolis are classified as Other Backward Class (OBC) by Government of Karnataka.

Varna classification 

Mogaveeras or Mogers are classified as shudras of pure descent

References 

Tuluva
People from Udupi district
People from Dakshina Kannada district
People from Kasaragod district